Stephen David Lawn (13 March 1966 – 23 September 2016) was a Professor of Infectious diseases and Tropical medicine known for research on tuberculosis and HIV/AIDS.

Personal life 
Lawn was married to Professor Joy Lawn. They have a son, Tim, and a daughter, Joanna.

References

1966 births
2016 deaths
Academic staff of the University of Cape Town
People from York